A serge is a hitching post, property marker, and ritual pole used among the Buryats and Yakuts.

Property marker 
The  is placed to indicate that the place in question has an owner. Traditionally, a  cannot be destroyed, but can only decay.

Religious use 

The  is connected to the horse cult, as both the hosts and the guests tied their horses to it. It is also a symbol of the world tree that unites the three worlds: Three horizontal grooves are cut on the pole, the upper one intended to bind the horses of the heavenly inhabitants of the upper world, the middle one intended for the horses of men, and the lower one for the horses of the underworld.

Three s made from birch trees (generally dug up by the roots) were used at the initiation of the shaman. One has ribbons tied to it, the colors of the ribbons indicating whether the shaman is to be a black or yellow shaman, or serve both good and evil. Another has a bell attached to it and a horse, as a sacrifice. A third is to be climbed by the new shaman.

At the cemeteries of the shamans very high s were placed for the unification of gods and spirits. s in the form of stone obelisks were also placed on these cemeteries (deer stones).

Gallery

See also

References

Buryat culture
Yakut culture
Wooden sculptures
Types of monuments and memorials